Luke's Kingdom is a 1976 Australian TV series set in colonial Australia. Directors included Peter Weir and writers included Elisabeth Kata and Tony Morphett. It was co-produced with Trident Television, the then owners of Yorkshire and Tyne Tees Television, and aired in 1976 on Nine Network in Australia and ITV in the United Kingdom.

In 1975, Trident Television acquired the series co-producer, Australia Pty Ltd. Filming completed in 1974.

The series starred Oliver Tobias as an Englishman who, in 1829, emigrates to Australia with his father and siblings to settle on a land grant in New South Wales. It was based on the novel "Pages From A Squatter's Diary", by E.V. Timms.

References

External links
Luke's Kingdom at Australian Television

Nine Network original programming
Australian drama television series
1976 Australian television series debuts
Television shows set in colonial Australia
English-language television shows